Leslie Baxter (17 November 1916 – 10 November 2002) was a South African cricket umpire. He stood in four Test matches between 1964 and 1966.

See also
 List of Test cricket umpires

References

1916 births
2002 deaths
South African Test cricket umpires